Shanti Ram Nepal is a long distance marathon runner from Samdong, East Sikkim, Sikkim, India who completed a 500 km footrace in 74 hr which is starting from Gangtok at 11.00 am on August 25, 2014, he proceeded via Mangan-Ravangla-Gyalshing-Melli route to finish the race at Gangtok at 1.00 pm on August 28, 2014 and was listed longest/fastest run on hill roads in the Limca book of records.

Sikkim to New Delhi Long Run

On July 23, 2016 at 10:30 am he started his long distance run from Raj Bhavan in Gangtok to New Delhi which is around 2000 km to spread the message of Organic farming in Sikkim, Swachh Bharat Abhiyan and Beti Bachao, Beti Padhao Yojana.

References

1990 births
Living people